Lisa Fonssagrives (born Lisa Birgitta Bernstone; 17 May 1911 – 4 February 1992), was a Swedish fashion model widely credited with having been the first supermodel.

Biography
Lisa Fonssagrives was born Lisa Birgitta Bernstone on 17 May 1911, in Sweden (variously reported as Gothenburg or Uddevalla) and raised in Uddevalla. As a child, she took up painting, sculpting and dancing. She went to Mary Wigman's school in Berlin and studied art and dance. After returning to Sweden, she opened a dance school. She moved from Sweden to Paris to train for ballet (after participating with choreographer Astrid Malmborg in an international competition) and worked as a private dance teacher with Fernand Fonssagrives, which then led to a modeling career. She would say that modeling was "still dancing". While in Paris in 1936, photographer Willy Maywald discovered her in an elevator and asked her to model hats for him. The photographs were then sent to Vogue, and Vogue photographer Horst took some test photographs of her. In July 1939, she appeared in the German illustrated weekly Der Stern. Before Fonssagrives came to the United States in 1939, she was already a top model. Her image appeared on the cover of many magazines during the 1930s, 1940s and 1950s, including Town & Country, Life, Time, Vogue, and the original Vanity Fair. She was reported as "the highest paid, highest praised, high fashion model in the business". Fonssagrives once described herself as a "good clothes hanger".

She worked with fashion photographers including George Hoyningen-Huene, Man Ray, Horst, Erwin Blumenfeld, George Platt Lynes, Richard Avedon, and Edgar de Evia. She married Parisian photographer Fernand Fonssagrives in 1935; they divorced in 1949 and she married another photographer, Irving Penn, in 1950. She went on to become a sculptor in the 1960s and was represented by the Marlborough Gallery in Manhattan.

Fonssagrives died, aged 80, in New York, survived by her second husband, Irving Penn and her two children: her daughter Mia Fonssagrives-Solow, a fashion and jewelry designer and sculptor who was married to real estate developer and art collector Sheldon Solow, and her son, Tom Penn, a designer.

The Elton John photography collection auction, held by Christie's on 15 October 2004, sold a 1950 Irving Penn photograph of his wife, Lisa Fonssagrives, for $57,360.

References

Bibliography
 Fonssagrives, Fernand; Muir, Robin (essay), Fernand Fonssagrives; An Eye for Beauty, London: Guiding Light, 2003. 
 Lisa Fonssagrives-Penn: Bronzes (exhibition catalogue), New York: Marlborough Gallery, Inc., 1983. 
 Lisa Fonssagrives-Penn: Sculpture, Prints and Drawings (exhibition catalogue), Lisa Fonssagrives-Penn Trust, 1994.
 Gross, Michael: Model: The Ugly Business of Beautiful Women, New York: W. Morrow, 1995, 
 Seidner, David (ed): Lisa Fonssagrives: Three Decades of Classic Fashion Photography, New York: Vendome Press, 1996,

Further reading

External links

 The Internet Fashion Database
 Lisa Fonssagrives-Penn, a Multi Talent, bio and photo gallery
 Photographs of Fernand and Lisa Fonssagrives at the Museum of the City of New York
 Mia Fonssagrives-Solow website

1911 births
1992 deaths
Swedish emigrants to the United States
Swedish female models
People from Västra Götaland County